The  is an electric multiple unit (EMU) train type formerly operated in Japan by the private railway operator Hankyu Corporation from 1964 until 2016.

Formations
Trains were formed as four-car and permanently coupled 3+3-car sets, as follows.

4-car sets

Car 2 was fitted with two pantographs, and car 3 was designated as a mildly air-conditioned car.

3+3-car sets

Cars 2 and 5 were each fitted with two pantographs, and car 5 was designated as a mildly air-conditioned car.

One 3100 series car, 3651, is inserted in 3000 series four-car set 3007.

History
40 3100 series cars were built between 1964 and 1967 for use on the Hankyu Takarazuka Line. Initially not air-conditioned, the fleet was retro-fitted with air-conditioning between 1975 and 1981.

The last remaining set, four-car set 3150, was withdrawn following its final run on 8 July 2016.

References

Electric multiple units of Japan
3100 series
Train-related introductions in 1964

ja:阪急3000系電車#3100系
600 V DC multiple units
1500 V DC multiple units of Japan
Alna Koki rolling stock